Charles Oliver "Barney" Carr (27 August 1897 – 19 January 1971) was an Australian rules footballer who played with St Kilda in the Victorian Football League during the 1920s.

A centreman, Carr played 130 games with St Kilda and represented Victoria at interstate football on nine occasions. He won St Kilda's best and fairest in 1922 and was club captain during the latter part of the 1925 season.

External links

Trevor Barker Award winners
1897 births
Australian military personnel of World War I
Australian rules footballers from Melbourne
St Kilda Football Club players
Prahran Football Club players
1971 deaths
People from Port Melbourne
Military personnel from Melbourne